Laton is a ghost town in Corning Township, Rooks County, Kansas, United States.

History
Eagle Creek was issued a post office in 1878. In 1884 the post office name was changed to Laton before being discontinued in 1904. In addition to the post office Laton had a school, store, cream station, garage, blacksmith shop, and telephone office. The population in 1910 was 30.

The Midland Trail (Red Line Highway) passed thru Laton on its initial route in 1914. The creation of U.S Route 40N (US-24) to the north and K-18 highway to the south by-passed Laton.

Laton School District R-5, Rooks County, Kansas was disorganized in 1962. There is nothing left of Laton.

References

Former populated places in Rooks County, Kansas
Former populated places in Kansas
1878 establishments in Kansas
Populated places established in 1878